The 14"/50 caliber railway guns were spare US Navy Mk 4 14 inch/50 caliber guns mounted on railway cars and operated by US Navy crews in France in the closing months of World War I.

Background
There was also a need for the Allies to bombard strategic targets in the German rear areas to hinder German capability to stage attacks. The largest Allied guns in the area were British 12-inch Mk X guns which were outranged.

Mark I Navy railway mount

Upon its entry into the war, the US chose its largest and longest-ranged available naval gun to fill the gap—the 14"/50 caliber Mk 4 gun with a muzzle velocity of 2800 feet per second. The new 16-inch gun would have been preferable, but it was not yet available in numbers; spare 14-inch guns kept for the active fleet were used instead.

Baldwin Locomotive Works delivered five trains for the United States Navy during April and May 1918. Each train transported and supported a 14"/50 caliber Mk 4 gun mounted on a rail carriage with four 6-wheel bogies.

Arrival in France
There was some doubt as to whether the Flanders coast and French Channel ports were now safe Allied ports, following the German spring offensive successes in March and April 1918 which brought those areas within German artillery and attack range. The guns were therefore diverted from the British zone in the north to further south, to the port of St. Nazaire, to avoid the risk of having such valuable assets captured or destroyed.

Each battery composed of a locomotive, gun car, ammunition cars, supporting equipment cars, and accommodation cars for the crew was under the command of a United States Navy lieutenant, and under overall command of Rear Admiral Charles Peshall Plunkett.  After delivery by ship, these trains were assembled in St. Nazaire in August.

Operation

Supports were also embedded in this pit connected to the gun mounting, to transmit remaining recoil energy directly to the ground and avoid placing excessive vertical strain on the gun car (and, through it, the track) and prevent it from moving backwards. In fact, by late 1918 the French had already constructed many such curved spurs (épis) for their own guns and hence the US guns were often able to re-use these.

The gun car was positioned over the pit, the wheels were locked and the platform was locked into position with gun mount and car's weight shifted from the trucks (bogies) directly to the ground by jacks and lifting screws. The rails were removed from above the pit because the gun breech was too wide to pass between them. The gun could elevate up to 43°, which gave it a maximum range of 42,000 yards (23.8 miles/38.4 km), and could be traversed 2.5° left and right of center. Any greater change of direction required the gun to be moved forward or backward along its curved track and a new recoil pit dug. The gun used the standard naval gun mounting and recoil system, with the addition of a pneumatic system to assist the runout springs to return the gun to firing position after recoil at the higher maximum elevation of 43° compared to maximum 30° in naval use.

A major disadvantage of the Mark I mount was that the weight was distributed forward, placing weight on the leading axles that was above the normally allowable weight for French railways, and also caused axle bearings to overheat at any speed over 5–10 mph. The armored enclosed gun house lacked ventilation and caused condensation to form, which promoted rusting. The necessity to excavate a recoil pit was also not acceptable as a long-term solution of recoil control. Hence the Mark I, while functioning as designed, was seen as only a compromise measure necessitated by wartime time constraints.

Combat service

The guns served to support General Pershing's army offensive in the Meuse-Argonne sector of the Western Front in France. They operated as single-gun batteries designated Battery 1 to Battery 5. Battery 2, commanded by Lieutenant (JG) E. D. Duckett, US Navy, had the distinction of being the first all-US gun (crew, gun, and ammunition) to fire in action on the Western Front. On 6 September 1918 they fired from the forest of Compiegne at the important German railway center of Tergnier in support of an Allied attack.

The guns were used to target key infrastructure deep behind the German lines, such as railway junctions and other lines of communication and concentration, typically only opening fire after an Allied attack had begun to avoid giving the Germans any warning of Allied intentions.

They fired 782 shells on 25 separate active days on the Western Front at ranges between 27 and 36 kilometers. This equated to an average of 156 rounds per gun, which was approximately half the 300 rounds expected life of these guns before they would need refurbishment. The guns were only fired for specific strategic purposes to conserve barrel life, with smaller guns being used whenever possible. Hence on many days they remained inactive or were being moved.

The last shot was fired by Battery 4 at 10:57:30 a.m. on 11 November 1918, timed to land just before the scheduled Armistice at 11 a.m.

Mark I Army railway mount
The US Army ordered three units identical to the Navy Mark I mountings in May 1918 and another three in July 1918, also from Baldwin Locomotive Works. They were all completed by 20 September 1918 but the war ended before they were required to be shipped to France.

Mark II Navy railway mount

The new Mark II gun car developed during 1918 carried the same 14"/50 caliber Mk 4 gun but addressed the problem areas: it dispensed with the armored gun house, with gunners working in the open; the weight was more evenly spread over 20 axles instead of 12; the French system of rolling recoil was adopted, in which the gun was mounted higher to allow full recoil at maximum elevation without striking the ground and the car rolled back 30–40 feet after firing to absorb remaining recoil. This made it possible to fire the gun along any part of its curved track without any prior preparation, with elevation up to 40°. After firing, the gun car used a winch mounted at the front, connected to a strong point in the ground in front, to pull itself back to its firing position. World War I ended before the Mark II entered service, and it was used for coastal defense in the US.

Surviving examples

 One gun on a US Navy Mark I railway car is preserved at the National Museum of the United States Navy, Washington Navy Yard, Washington, D.C.

See also
 14"/50 caliber gun: gun description and US Navy service
 14-inch M1920 railway gun—US successor
 List of railway artillery

Weapons of comparable role, performance and era
 BL 14 inch Railway Gun: British equivalent

Notes and references

Bibliography
 
 Ralph Earle, Editor (1920), "Navy Ordnance Activities. World War 1917–1918".  Government Printing Office, Washington, D.C.
 
 Willcox, Cornélis De Witt, and Edwin Roy Stuart (1918): The International Military Digest Annual for 1917. Cumulative Digest Corporation, New York. pp. 169–170.
 TM 9-2300 standard artillery and fire control material. dated 1944

External links

 "Navy 14 Inch Railway Guns in France, 1918" original film of 14 inch railroad naval cannon in action in World War I.
 "Battleships on Wheels" Popular Science Monthly, January 1928, pp. 16–18, 123–125, author was the US Navy admiral in charge of World War I 14-inch naval railroad cannon program.
Record and Log of U.S. Naval Railway Battery 5, 1918, MS 524 held by Special Collections & Archives, Nimitz Library at the United States Naval Academy

356 mm artillery
World War I artillery of the United States
Railway guns